Rear-Admiral Sir Errol Manners  (29 June 1883 – 23 October 1953) was a British Royal Navy officer and author on theology and British Israelism. He completed fifty-two ocean convoys during the Second World War, including ONM 249 which consisted of 153 ships. He wrote segments of research in a lengthy book titled Bible Research published in 1946, which quickly became popular among proponents of British Israelism for its chapter titled "The Hebrew origin of English. Israelite heraldry in Anglo-Saxon countries".

He and his three sons, Rodney (1905–1998), Sherard (1908–1987) and John (1914–2020), all served as naval officers in World War II. His daughter Angela (1918–) served as a wren in World War II. In 2018 his last surviving son John became the world's longest-lived first-class cricketer.

References 

 Errol Manners, Dreadnought Project 

Royal Navy admirals
1883 births
1953 deaths
British Israelism
Graduates of Britannia Royal Naval College